003 is the third studio album released by Serbian and former Yugoslav singer-songwriter Đorđe Balašević.

While 003 featured the same poetics as Balašević's earlier albums, a marked change was its political stance, most prominently showcased by the album's cover. On the background collage of newspaper clippings about financial crime, loans and price hikes, an illustration of three wise monkeys provided Balašević's comment on the ongoing political and social turmoil in the country.

A year after its release, Balašević commented on the album:
Initially, the songs I didn't care about, "Al' se nekad dobro jelo" and "Baby Blue", received airplay, and "Slovenska" was discovered only later. Today, this record is remembered only for "Slovenska", because that's a real song.

He remarked that "Slovenska" was the first song on the album that came across his mind, but was the last to be finished. It was written and recorded in one day, which was also the last day in the recording studio.

Track listing

Legacy
In 2015 003 album cover was ranked 42nd on the list of 100 Greatest Album Covers of Yugoslav Rock published by web magazine Balkanrock.

References

 EX YU ROCK enciklopedija 1960–2006, Janjatović Petar;

External links
003 at Discogs

1985 albums
Đorđe Balašević albums
PGP-RTB albums